Ringo Madlingozi (born 12 December 1964) is a South African singer, songwriter, record producer and a Member of the National Assembly of South Africa. Madlingozi rose to fame when he and his band Peto won the Shell Road to Fame contest in 1986. He later formed a group called Gecko Moon with Alan Cameron, a fellow Peto member.

Early life 
Madlingozi was born in Peddie, Eastern Cape. A chance encounter with renowned producer and head of Island Records, Chris Blackwell, changed the course of Madlingozi's creative life. "Blackwell chided me for not sticking to what I know best – my people, my language and my culture," Madlingozi said. "It was as if a bright light had been turned on in my mind and this led directly to the recording of my debut album, Vukani."

The album marked a new direction for Madlingozi. Literally meaning "Wake Up", the album firmly rooted Madlingozi in the African pop genre, giving expression to the "ukuxhentsa" rhythms that had inspired the singer in his youth when he used to listen to "amagqirha" or traditional healers in his neighbourhood and appreciate their rhythms. The addition of a contemporary sound whilst still being grounded in the tradition of the Xhosa guitar, cemented what has now become known as the "Ringo" sound. The sound has found its expression in several other releases, each one building on the success of the last.

Family 
Ringo has one son, Phila Madlingozi. He is an actor and an artist.

Career

Music 
Madlingozi later formed a group called Gecko Moon with Alan Cameron, a fellow Peto member. Their popular hit was "Green-Green", which was a crossover track and was well received by music lovers.

Madlingozi's debut solo album, Vukani, sold tens of thousands of copies.

He has subsequently received multiple awards for his albums at the South African Music Awards (SAMA) and the Kora Awards, where, among others, he won the Best Male Artist in Southern Africa and the African continent Awards. He collaborated with international acclaimed group UB40 as part of the United Nations Global AIDS awareness program, recording the Xhosa lyrics of "Cover Up".

Politics 
In May 2019, Madlingozi was sworn in as a Member of Parliament in the sixth administration of the democratic government of the Republic of South Africa. He has been accused of defending racist statements categorising people of races such as asians (“Indians" in South Africa), people of mixed race (“Coloureds” in South Africa) and whites as categorically racist.

Artistic influences 
Madlingozi's vocal hero is Victor Ndlazilwane. Many upcoming artists like Nathi Mankayi and Vusi Nova have been influenced by Madlingnozi.

Philanthropy work 
For the past few years Madlingozi has been working with, or assisting in the following centres:

 Takalani Home for the Disabled in Soweto
 Sinethemba Home in Benoni
 Van Rijn Place of Safety in Benoni
 Siyazigabisa Home of Hope in Tembisa and in Port Elizabeth
 Enkuselweni Place of Safety
 In Enkuselweni, Madlingozi works with the youth to motivate them and give financial assistance in the form of donations and benefit concerts.

At Van Rijn he has been doing the same and assisting them with music training and together with Sindi Dlathu of Muvhango fame; they also coached the kids in dance. He has assisted a few times with collecting clothes for and giving Christmas gifts to the children there.

In Takalani home he has given entertainment for the residents in the form of free unplugged sessions and also gives food and financial donations whenever necessary.

At Sinethemba, he plays more of a parental role to the kids, as it is a fairly small home, with fewer children. He guides and motivates the kids and accompanies them to their school functions, such as Matric Dances. He assists with buying clothes and gifts for the children and assists wherever and whenever it is necessary.

In Durban, together with Nkosi Ngubane, he started the Adopt a Child Project, where a person supports an orphaned child.

In the recent past, he has been given ambassadorship for HIV/AIDS and Anti-Women and Child Abuse Campaign by the Gauteng Department of Social Welfare.

He has also worked with Khuluma Ndoda, an anti-women abuse movement started by actor Patrick Shai.

Madlingozi appeared on the third one-off TV special of quiz show Test the Nation, entitled National Parenting Test, as a celebrity guest.

Discography
Vukani (1996)
Sondelani (1997)
Mamelani (1998)
Into Yam''' (1999)Buyisa (2000)Ntumba (2002)Baleka (2004)Ndim'lo (2006)Qhubeka (2008)Jayiva Sbali (2010)Vukani (2014)Love songs (2006)Ringo Live DVD (2003)Ringo Live CD'' (2003)

Awards and nominations

References

External links

 

Living people
South African musicians
Afro pop music
1964 births
Members of the National Assembly of South Africa
Economic Freedom Fighters politicians